Prosper Philippe Augouard , C.S.Sp. (17 September 1852 – 3 October 1921) was a French Catholic priest, missionary, and explorer of Africa.

Early life 
Augouard was born 17 September 1852 in Poitiers, France. His father was Francis, a carpenter. His mother was Jeanne Adèle, maiden name Barreau.

Career 
Augouard was educated at Montmorillon to become a French priest. When Augouard was at Rennes he was a volunteer in the Siege of Paris of 1870–71. During this time he met Bishop Louis Gaston Adrien de Ségur and learned the philosophy of being a Christian bishop. Augouard heard the story told by Antoine Horner of his missions in Zanzibar and East Africa, which motivated him to join the organization known as the Holy Ghost Fathers (C.S.Sp.). He then traveled to Africa in December 1877 as secretary to Bishop Le Berre, Vicar Apostolic of Gabon. In 1879, at age 27, Augouard went on an exploring expedition for about a month to the interior of central Africa. He arrived at Lake Nkunda (aka Malebo Pool) five days after the renowned Welsh journalist and explorer Henry Morton Stanley arrived there.

Augouard is known for exploring the Congo and Ubangi Rivers, for which he was awarded a prize from the Paris Geographical Society. Augouard settled in Brazzaville in 1887. In 1890 he was appointed Bishop of Brazzaville and vicar apostolic of the Upper Congo and Oubangui.
Because of his rapid expansion of missions he was nicknamed Diata-Diata, meaning 'quick-quick'.

Later life 
Augouard returned to Paris for health reasons around 1920. He died 3 October 1921 at the Mother House.

Accolades and awards 

 Academy of Moral and Political Sciences award of $3000 in April 1912.
 Officer of the Legion of Honor
 Colonial Medal of Congo
 Medal of 1870
 Commander of the Order of Leopold
 Officer of the Royal Crown of Belgium
 Civic Crown by the National Society to Encourage the Good.

Works 
 (1890) La Mission de l'Oubanghi. Conférence, etc.
 (1895) Le Congo et son apôtre Monseigneur Augouard
 (1913) Les deux Congo. 35 ans d'apostolat au Congo français. Mgr. Augouard. Les origines du Congo belge.
 (1924) Un explorateur et un apôtre du Congo français. Monseigneur Augouard, archevêque titulaire de Cassiopée, vicaire apostolique du Congo français. Sa vie, par le baron Jehan de Witte. Ses notes de voyage et sa correspondence. [With plates, portraits, and maps]
 (1926) Monseigneur Augouard, etc. [With portraits]
 (1934) Guirlande enchevêtrée d'anecdotes congolaises

References

Bibliography

External links
 

 
19th-century French Roman Catholic priests
19th-century Roman Catholic bishops in the Republic of the Congo
20th-century Roman Catholic bishops in the Republic of the Congo
People from Brazzaville
1852 births
1921 deaths
Roman Catholic bishops of Brazzaville